The Russian Revolution is a pamphlet written in 1918 by Polish-German Marxist theorist Rosa Luxemburg. It was posthumously published in 1922 by fellow Spartacist Paul Levi.

Summary
Luxemburg discusses the 1917 February and October revolutions in Russia. Her three major criticisms of the policies implemented by the Bolshevik Party were its korenizatsiya policy of self-determination for ethnic minorities, its distribution of land to individual peasant farmers instead of immediate collectivization, and its anti-democratic dissolution of the Russian Constituent Assembly. In general, Luxemburg was critical of Bolshevik leader Vladimir Lenin's centralization of power and creation of a single party state, and the suppression of civil liberties such as freedom of the press, association and assembly.

Sections of the work include:
 Fundamental Significance of the Russian Revolution
 The Bolshevik Land Policy
 The Nationalities Question
 The Constituent Assembly
 The Question of Suffrage
 The Problem of Dictatorship
 The Struggle Against Corruption
 Democracy and Dictatorship

References

1922 books
Political books
Pamphlets
Works by Rosa Luxemburg
Russian Revolution